Burguçy geňeşligi is a rural council in Köýtendag District, Lebap Province, in eastern Turkmenistan, near the border with Afghanistan. The rural council consists of the following villages: Hatap (the seat), Çanakçy, Daýhan, and Olamsurhy.  Prior to 10 November 2022 it was under jurisdiction of Döwletli District, which was abolished on that date.

See also 
List of cities, towns and villages in Turkmenistan

References

Populated places in Lebap Region